Gurthiern (also Guthiern, Gunthiern, and Gunthiernus) was a Welsh prince. According to the Vita sancta Gurthierni, he became a hermit in Brittany and founder of an abbey at Kemperle (Quimperlé). He is a Catholic and Orthodox saint with a feast day on 3 July.

References

External links
Online text of the Vita
 Heiligenlexikon-1858 entry

Medieval Welsh saints
Medieval Breton saints
5th-century Christian saints